The white woman of Gippsland, or the captive woman of Gippsland, was supposedly a European woman rumoured to have been held against her will by Aboriginal Kurnai people in the Gippsland region of Australia in the 1840s. Her supposed plight excited searches and much speculation at the time, though nothing to put her existence beyond the level of rumour was ever found.

Accounts of the woman vary. In a popular account she was one of two women travelling on the ship Britannia, which wrecked on Ninety Mile Beach in 1841. There were two women aboard, the wife of the Captain and a woman sailing to Sydney to join her fiancé, Mr Frazer. Another account says the woman was a mother who sought protection with local Aboriginal people with her baby girl after leaving her callous and brutal husband.

One possible source of the rumour was that a group of white pioneers had come upon an Aboriginal camp near Port Albert which had been hurriedly vacated. They found some female attire and a towel (being used to block the end of a canoe) and a heart shape drawn in the ground. Another account has the heart shape near Sale and carved into both the ground and a tree (from which a farm called Heart Station was named).

In any case, representations to the government by settlers resulted in various searches by police and native police. One expedition left special handkerchiefs that she might come across, with a message in English and Gaelic (because it was thought she might be from the Scottish highlands) reading:

WHITE WOMAN! – There are fourteen armed men, partly White and partly Black, in search of you. Be cautious; and rush to them when you see them near you. Be particularly on the look out every dawn of morning, for it is then that the party are in hopes of rescuing you. The white settlement is towards the setting sun.

For some two years the Aboriginal people of the area were hunted for what they were imagined to have done. A boy called Thackewarren from the Warrigul people was captured and taught English, and used as an interpreter to tell his people that the white woman must be found. The Commissioner of Crown Lands, Tyer, was delighted when they promised to return her, and on the arranged day preparations were made to receive her. To the utter astonishment of all present, the Aboriginal people arrived with a carved wooden bust of a woman, the figurehead from the ship Britannia.

This figurehead could even have been the source of the rumours all along, in the possession of the Aboriginal people, becoming a real woman in the retelling.

See also
Eliza Fraser
Gippsland massacres
Missing white woman syndrome

Notes

References
 Bill Wannan, Australian Folklore, Lansdowne Press, 1970, reprint 1979 , entry for "Captive Woman of Gipsland", page 117.

 

Gippsland (region)
History of Indigenous Australians
History of Victoria (Australia)
Legendary Australian people
People whose existence is disputed
Gunaikurnai